Serene Velocity is a compilation album by Stereolab, released in late 2006. It focuses on material released during the band's Elektra years.

Track listing
 "Jenny Ondioline, Pt. 1" (from the 1993 Jenny Ondioline EP.) – 3:42
 "Crest" (from Transient Random-Noise Bursts with Announcements (1993)) – 6:07
 "French Disko" (from the 1993 French Disko single.) – 3:33
 "Ping Pong" (from Mars Audiac Quintet (1994)) – 3:02
 "Wow and Flutter" (7" Version) (from the 1994 Wow and Flutter EP) – 3:02
 "Cybele's Reverie" (from Emperor Tomato Ketchup (1996)) – 4:42
 "Metronomic Underground" – 7:52
 "Percolator" – 4:15
 "Brakhage" (from Dots and Loops (1997)) – 5:29
 "Miss Modular" – 4:13
 "Infinity Girl" (from Cobra and Phases Group Play Voltage in the Milky Night (1999)) – 3:55
 "Come and Play in the Milky Night" – 4:38
 "Space Moth" (from Sound-Dust (2001)) – 7:34
 "Double Rocker" – 5:32
 "Vonal Declosion"  (from Margerine Eclipse 2004)) – 3:27
 "...Sudden Stars" – 4:41

References

 

2006 compilation albums
Stereolab compilation albums
Rhino Records compilation albums